Yusuke Aihara (born April 13, 1994 in Osaka) is a Japanese professional vert skater. Aihara started skating when he was seven years old in 2001 and turned professional in 2008. Aihara has attended many competitions in his vert skating career.

Notable tricks: Rocket 540, Frontside 900, Backside 1080.

Vert competitions
2019 JASPA All Japan Championships, Kobe, Japan - Vert : 1st
2016 JASPA All Japan Championships, Kobe, Japan - Vert : 1st
2013 EC European Championships, Montana, Bulgaria - Vert: 3rd
2012 EC European Championships, Copenhagen, Denmark - Vert: 3rd
2012 JASPA All Japan Championships, Kobe, Japan - Vert: 3rd
2012 X-GAMES ASIA, Shanghai, China - Vert: 3rd
2011 X-GAMES ASIA, Shanghai, China - Vert: 3rd
2011 JASPA All Japan Championships, Kobe, Japan - Vert: 2nd
2010 World Action Sports B3 Championships, ChunChone, Korea - Vert: 2nd
2010 JASPA All Japan Championships, Kobe, Japan - Vert: 2nd
2009 X-GAMES ASIA, Shanghai, China - Vert: 5th
2008 AIL World Championships, Tehachapi, CA, USA - Vert: 1st
2008 JASPA All Japan Championships, Kobe, Japan - Vert: 3rd
2007 Asian Indoor Games, Macau, China - Vert: 1st 
2006 ASA Amateur World Championships, Dallas, USA - Vert: 6th
2006 X-GAMES ASIA, Kuala Lumpur, Malaysia - Vert: 8th

External links
Espn.com
Kiaxgamesasia.com - results
Kiaxgamesasia.com - athletes
Kiaxgamesasia.com - news article
Kiaxgamesasia.com - news article
Kiaxgamesasia.com - news article
Espneventmedia.com
Blogs.bettor.com
Mb.com.ph
Skatingfull.com
Espn.go.com
Rollernews.com

Vert skaters
1994 births
Living people
X Games athletes